Eilema viettei is a moth of the subfamily Arctiinae first described by Hervé de Toulgoët in 1954. It is found in Mauritius.

References

Moths described in 1954
viettei